Lenora is a city in Norton County, Kansas, United States.  As of the 2020 census, the population of the city was 207.

History
Lenora was founded in 1873. It was named for Mrs. Lenora Hauser, a pioneer settler.

The first post office in Lenora was established in June 1874.

Geography
Lenora is located at  (39.610975, -100.001391).

Demographics

2010 census
As of the census of 2010, there were 250 people, 126 households, and 69 families residing in the city. The racial makeup of the city was 98.0% White and 2.0% from two or more races. Hispanic or Latino of any race were 2.8% of the population.

There were 126 households, of which 18.3% had children under the age of 18 living with them, 48.4% were married couples living together, 4.0% had a female householder with no husband present, 2.4% had a male householder with no wife present, and 45.2% were non-families. 40.5% of all households were made up of individuals, and 16.6% had someone living alone who was 65 years of age or older. The average household size was 1.98 and the average family size was 2.59.

The median age in the city was 50.8 years. 16.8% of residents were under the age of 18; 3.6% were between the ages of 18 and 24; 20.8% were from 25 to 44; 30.8% were from 45 to 64; and 28% were 65 years of age or older. The gender makeup of the city was 52.8% male and 47.2% female.

2000 census
As of the census of 2000, there were 306 people, 141 households, and 83 families residing in the city. The racial makeup of the city was 96.41% White, 0.98% African American, 0.33% Asian, and 2.29% from two or more races. Hispanic or Latino of any race were 1.31% of the population.

There were 141 households, out of which 21.3% had children under the age of 18 living with them, 49.6% were married couples living together, 5.7% had a female householder with no husband present, and 41.1% were non-families. 38.3% of all households were made up of individuals, and 19.9% had someone living alone who was 65 years of age or older. The average household size was 2.17 and the average family size was 2.88.

In the city, the population was spread out, with 21.6% under the age of 18, 6.2% from 18 to 24, 27.5% from 25 to 44, 22.2% from 45 to 64, and 22.5% who were 65 years of age or older. The median age was 42 years. For every 100 females, there were 102.6 males. For every 100 females age 18 and over, there were 106.9 males.

The median income for a household in the city was $32,500, and the median income for a family was $39,250. Males had a median income of $27,361 versus $18,875 for females. The per capita income for the city was $15,426. About 2.2% of families and 7.3% of the population were below the poverty line, including none of those under the age of eighteen and 22.6% of those 65 or over.

Education
The community is served by Norton USD 211 public school district.

Lenora schools were closed through school unification. The Lenora High School mascot was Lenora Wildcats.

References

Further reading

External links

 City of Lenora
 Lenora - Directory of Public Officials
 Lenora city map, KDOT

Cities in Kansas
Cities in Norton County, Kansas